Sriramapuram is a panchayat town in Dindigul district in the Indian state of Tamil Nadu.

Demographics
 India census, Sriramapuram had a population of 8927. Males constitute 50% of the population and females 50%. Sriramapuram has an average literacy rate of 53%, lower than the national average of 59.5%: male literacy is 63%, and female literacy is 44%. In Sriramapuram, 11% of the population is under 6 years of age.

References

Cities and towns in Dindigul district